Andhra Bank was a medium-sized public sector bank (PSB) of India, with a network of 2885 branches, 4 extension counters, 38 satellite offices and 3798 automated teller machines (ATMs) as of 31 March 2019. During 2011–12, the bank entered the states of Tripura and Himachal Pradesh. It operated in 25 states and three union territories. It had its headquarters in Hyderabad, Telangana, India. Along with Corporation Bank, Andhra Bank was merged with Union Bank of India in April 2020.

The government of India owned 90.85% of its share capital as on 31 March 2019. The state owned Life Insurance Corporation held 7.80% of the shares.

History 

Bhogaraju Pattabhi Sitaramayya founded Andhra Bank in 1923 in Machilipatnam, Madras Presidency (present-day Andhra Pradesh). Raja Yarlagadda Sivarama Prasad was the individual who committed the financial resources for starting the institution. In 1956, linguistic division of States was promulgated and Hyderabad was made the capital of Andhra Pradesh. The registered office of the bank was subsequently shifted to Andhra Bank Buildings, Sultan Bazar, Hyderabad. In the second phase of nationalisation of commercial banks commenced in April 1980, the bank became a wholly Government-owned. In 1964, the bank merged with Bharat Lakshmi Bank and further consolidated its position in Andhra Pradesh.

IndiaFirst Life Insurance Company is a life insurance company in India. It is a joint venture between two of India's public sector banks – Bank of Baroda (44%) and Andhra Bank (30%), and UK's financial and investment company Legal & General (26%). It was incorporated in November 2009. It has its headquarters in Mumbai. India First Life insurance company is headquartered in Mumbai. India First is the first life insurance company to be recommended for ISO certification within 7 months of inception.

On 30 August 2019, Finance Minister Nirmala Sitharaman announced that Andhra Bank and Corporation Bank would be merged into Union Bank of India. The Board of Directors of Andhra Bank approved the merger on 13 September. The Union Cabinet approved the merger on 4 March, and it was completed on 1 April 2020.

Products and services 

Andhra Bank introduced Internet Banking Facility (AB INFI-net) to all customers of cluster linked branches. Rail Ticket Booking Facility is made available to all debit card holders as well as to internet banking customers through IRCTC Website through a separate gateway. Corporate Website is available in English, Hindi and Telugu Languages communicating Bank's image and information.  Bank has been given 'BEST BANK AWARD' a banking technology award by IDRBT, Hyderabad for extensive use of IT in Semi Urban and Rural Areas on 2 September 2006. IBA Jointly with TFCI has conferred the Joint Runner-up Award to the Bank in the Best Payments initiative category in recognition of outstanding achievement of the Bank in promoting ATM Channel.

International expansion 

Andhra Bank opened a representative office in Dubai in May 2006 and another at Jersey City, New Jersey, in June 2009.

In 2010 Malaysia awarded a commercial banking license to a locally incorporated bank to be jointly owned by Bank of Baroda, Indian Overseas Bank and Andhra Bank. The new bank, India International Bank (Malaysia), is based in Kuala Lumpur. Andhra Bank will hold a 25% stake in the joint-venture. Bank of Baroda will own 40% and IOB the remaining 35%.

Andhra Bank entered MoU with Bank of Baroda and Legal & General Group of UK to form a joint venture life insurance company IndiaFirst Life Insurance Company.  The shareholders' agreement has already been signed and necessary formalities are being completed for setting up of the company. The JV Company is already incorporated in June'08 and is in the process of filing for approvals from IRDA etc. IndiaFirst has commenced operations.

Community involvement 

Andhra Bank, along with A P State Government, NABARD, Canara Bank, Indian Bank, IOB and SBH sponsored the Andhra Pradesh Banker's Institute of Entrepreneurship Development, which will offer training to unemployed youth for improving their skills in Andhra Pradesh.

Andhra Bank adopted Gundugolanu village, West Godavari District, Andhra Pradesh – the birthplace of its founder, Dr. Bhogaraju Pattabhi Sitaramayya.

See also 

List of banks in India

Notes

References

External links 

Draft Red Herring Prospectus of Andhra Bank filed with SEBI
 Andhra Bank Press release-March '15

Defunct banks of India
Banks established in 1923
Banks disestablished in 2020
Companies formerly listed on the Bombay Stock Exchange
Companies nationalised by the Government of India
Companies based in Hyderabad, India
Indian companies disestablished in 2020
Indian companies established in 1923
Companies listed on the National Stock Exchange of India
Companies listed on the Bombay Stock Exchange